Prabhu Narayan Government Inter College is one of the oldest college of Ramnagar and also of Varanasi. This institution has proudly assimilated the history of educational development.  It provides education to all society of people and is well equipped with highly qualified laboratory and classes. It has two floored laboratory of physics and chemistry and has one of the largest playground of Ramnagar, where many types of tournament is played by different colleges.

History
It was established on 13 January 1913 by Sir James Meston as Meston High School. Prabhu Narayan Singh was instrumental in setting up the school and donated requisite land for the school. Science laboratory was built in 1978 for proper education of the students. This college is also known as PN College. The hostel was arranged for the students coming from far away but later it was closed after it was not needed. In 1953, first edition of Nav Jyoti magazine was published in the college. This college is famous for his heritage buildings. The red color of this school makes more attractive. There is a well in the middle of field and an old ficus tree. There is a stage for cultural programs known as "Krishna Rang Manch." That stage made by the then present principal in 1988.  It became a government college after the independent India and has named Prabhu Narayan on the name of King of Ramnagar.

There is another stage which was built in 2000. For the first time, in 2000, then-Chief Minister Ram Prakash Gupta addressed the rally of the "Kisan Morcha". At that time the present central minister Rajnath Singh and former chief secretary of the state Om Prakash Singh were also present. After 17 years on 22 November 2017, chief minister of the province Yogi Adityanath addressed the people of Ramnagar from this stage.

Campus
It owns a large Hall which is one of the largest hall where many types of programs is held such as quiz competition, cultural programs, debates competition and several types of other programs. Playground of college is large for playing district level sports. In 2016, On the World Population Day, Uttar Pradesh Chief Minister Akhilesh Yadav initiated a campaign to make UP a green state. Calling it UP Goes Green, Akhilesh aims to plant 5 crore saplings within a span of 24 hours. So saplings also planted in 2 hectare area of college for being a part of "UP Goes Green Campaign". More than 2000 plants planted in field of college and students also contributed to planting all plants.

See also
List of educational institutions in Varanasi

References

Schools in Varanasi
Boys' schools in India
Intermediate colleges in Uttar Pradesh
Educational institutions established in 1898
1898 establishments in India